St. Agnes is a neogothic Catholic church in Neustadt-Nord, Cologne, Germany. It was consecrated in 1902 and is the second-largest church in Cologne after the Cologne cathedral. The church is named after Agnes of Rome.

Details of the Church

External links 

 Official webpage of the St. Agnes parish 

Agnes
Innenstadt, Cologne
Roman Catholic churches completed in 1902
Gothic Revival church buildings in Germany
20th-century Roman Catholic church buildings in Germany